Hong Kong Adventist Hospital may refer to:
Hong Kong Adventist Hospital – Stubbs Road, in Hong Kong Island
Hong Kong Adventist Hospital – Tsuen Wan, in New Territories